Mecaphesa importuna is a species of crab spider in the family Thomisidae. It is found in the United States.

Subspecies
These two subspecies belong to the species Mecaphesa importuna:
 (Mecaphesa importuna importuna) (Keyserling, 1881)
 Mecaphesa importuna belkini (Schick, 1965)

References

Thomisidae
Articles created by Qbugbot
Spiders described in 1881